Jennifer Martins (born January 31, 1989) is a Canadian rower. In 2016, she was named to represent Canada at the 2016 Summer Olympics in the women's pairs event with Nicole Hare. They finished in 14th place.

She represented Canada at the 2020 Summer Olympics.

References

External links

1989 births
Living people
Canadian female rowers
Rowers from Toronto
Rowers at the 2016 Summer Olympics
Rowers at the 2020 Summer Olympics
Olympic rowers of Canada
World Rowing Championships medalists for Canada
21st-century Canadian women